NGC 4753 is a lenticular galaxy located about 60 million light-years away in the constellation of Virgo. NGC 4753 was discovered by astronomer William Herschel on February 22, 1784. It is notable for having distinct dust lanes that surround its nucleus. It is a member of the NGC 4753 Group of galaxies, which is a member of the Virgo II Groups, a series of galaxies and galaxy clusters strung out from the southern edge of the Virgo Supercluster.

Physical characteristics
The distribution of dust in NGC 4753 lies in an inclined disk wrapped several times around the nucleus. The material in the disk may have been accreted from the merger of a gas rich dwarf galaxy. Over several orbital periods, the accreted material eventually smeared out into a disk. Differential precession that occurred after the accretion event caused the disk to twist. Eventually, the disk settled into a fixed orientation with respect to the galaxy. The age of the disk is estimated to be around half a billion to a billion years.

Another explanation suggests that the dust in NGC 4753 originated from red giant stars in the galaxy.

Dark matter
Analysis of the twisted disk in NGC 4753 by Steiman-Cameron et al. revealed that most of the mass in the galaxy lies in a slightly flattened spherical halo of dark matter.

Globular clusters
NGC 4753 has an estimated population of 1070 ± 120 globular clusters.

Supernovae
NGC 4753 has been the host to two supernovae, SN 1965I and SN 1983G.

SN 1965I
On June 18, 1965 a type 1a supernova was discovered in NGC 4753.

SN 1983G
Astronomer Robert Evan discovered a type 1a supernova known as SN 1983g in NGC 4753. The supernova was discovered on April 4, 1983.

Group membership
NGC 4753 is a member of its own galaxy group, known as the NGC 4753 Group. The NGC 4753 Group is located near the southern edge of the Virgo Cluster. The group, along with other groups of galaxies form part of a filament that  extends off from the southern border of the Virgo Cluster that is called the Virgo II Groups.

See also
 List of NGC objects (4001–5000)
 Centaurus A

References

External links

 De Vaucouleurs Atlas entry on NGC 4753

Lenticular galaxies
Peculiar galaxies
Virgo (constellation)
4753
43671
8009
Astronomical objects discovered in 1784